The 1989 Commonwealth Final was the sixth running of the Commonwealth Final as part of the qualification for the 1989 Speedway World Championship. The 1989 Final was run on 4 June at the Belle Vue Stadium in Manchester, England, and was part of the World Championship qualifying for riders from the Commonwealth nations.

Riders qualified for the Final from the Australian, British and New Zealand Championships.

1989 Commonwealth Final
4 June
 Manchester, Belle Vue Stadium
Qualification: Top 12 plus 1 reserve to the Overseas Final in Coventry, England

*Mitch Shirra and Darren Wilson replaced Larry Ross and Mark Thorpe. Troy Butler replaced Jamie Fagg.

References

See also
 Motorcycle Speedway

1989
World Individual
1989 in British motorsport
1989 in English sport
International sports competitions in Manchester